Alexandra Harrison (born 29 March 2002) is a French ice hockey player for Chamonix HC and the French national team.

She represented France at the 2019 IIHF Women's World Championship.

References

External links

2002 births
Living people
French women's ice hockey defencemen